Villaverde, officially the Municipality of Villaverde, also spelled as Villa Verde, is a 5th class municipality in the province of Nueva Vizcaya, Philippines. According to the 2020 census, it has a population of 20,118 people.

Etymology
The town got its name in honor of the Spanish Missionary, father Juan Villaverde.

History
Villaverde was formerly a barrio of Solano, Nueva Vizcaya called Ibung, founded by a Dominican Friar named Alejandro Vidal in 1767. More than a century later, an order from the Spanish Government was issued to Father Juan Villaverde giving instruction to organize into a town. Thus, on May 28, 1872, Ibung became a town of the province of Nueva Vizcaya.

When the American took over the reins of Government in the country, Ibung lost its identity as a town because of insufficient funds. Moreover, most of the people residing in the area have transferred to an adjoining towns for fear of their lives from barbarics non-Christian tribes who dwelt in the mountain fastness of the cordillera mountains in the north-west part of the town. Thus, the populated was reduced, Ibung, then, became again a mere barangay of the municipality of Solano.

On June 17, 1957, through the sponsorship of the Congressman Leonardo B. Perez, Republic Act. No. 197 was enacted providing for the creation of the town Ibung through the separation of the barrios of Ibung and Bintawan from Solano. Thus, on September 1, 1957, Antonio B. Aquino was appointed as the first Municipal Mayor of the town Ibung.

Two years later, on June 21, 1959, Republic Act. No. 2515 was enacted amending Republic Act. No. 1972 changing the name of IBUNG to VILLAVERDE in honor of the Spanish Missionary, father Juan Villaverde who had initiated the first stepin creation of the town. Romualdo Ubando was appointed as the first Municipal Mayor. In 1963 Antonio B. Aquino was the first elected Mayor.

Geography
Villaverde has a total land area of 81.50 square kilometers, the smallest town which accounts for 1.86% of the total land area of Nueva Vizcaya.

Barangays
Villaverde is politically subdivided into 9 barangays, with Barangay Poblacion were the Municipal Hall stands and Barangay Ibung, Bintawan Norte and Bintawan Sur as the commercial and educational center of the town. These barangays are headed by elected officials: Barangay Captain, Barangay Council, whose members are called Barangay Councilors. All are elected every three years.
 Bintawan Norte
 Bintawan Sur
 Cabuluan
 Ibung
 Nagbitin
 Ocapon
 Pieza
 Poblacion (Turod)
 Sawmill

Climate

Demographics

In the 2020 census, Villaverde had a population of 20,118.

Economy

Government
Villaverde, belonging to the lone congressional district of the province of Nueva Vizcaya, is governed by a mayor designated as its local chief executive and by a municipal council as its legislative body in accordance with the Local Government Code. The mayor, vice mayor, and the councilors are elected directly by the people through an election which is being held every three years.

Elected officials

Education
The Schools Division of Nueva Vizcaya governs the town's public education system. The division office is a field office of the DepEd in Cagayan Valley region. The office governs the public and private elementary and public and private high schools throughout the municipality.

Secondary schools
Bintawan National High School
Our Lady of Fatima School of Villaverde

See also
List of renamed cities and municipalities in the Philippines

References

External links

[ Philippine Standard Geographic Code]
Philippine Census Information
Local Governance Performance Management System
www.nuevavizcaya.gov.ph
www.lguvillaverde.com

Municipalities of Nueva Vizcaya